This is a list of interstates in Kentucky.


Primary highways

Auxiliary highways

See also

List of Parkways and named roads in Kentucky

References

 
Interstate